Hotwells and Harbourside is one of the thirty-four council wards in the city of Bristol in the Southwest of England, United Kingdom.

Hotwells and Harbourside

The ward covers part of the Centre (between Jacob's Wells Road and Park Street), Spike Island, and parts of Hotwells and Cliftonwood.

Hotwells and Harbourside has a large number of young people living in the area. Over 25% of the population is aged 16–24, significantly higher than the national average. People aged 25–39 also make a substantial part of the population, at over 35%.

Notable places in the ward include College Green, Bristol Cathedral, Bristol City Hall, Brandon Hill, Cabot Tower, and the Cumberland Basin.

Politics

Hotwells and Harbourside ward was created in May 2016 following a boundary review. It incorporates part of the areas formerly part of the Cabot ward. It is represented by one councillor on Bristol City Council. Since the ward's formation in 2016, it was held by the Liberal Democrats until 2023. A by-election due to councillor ill-health took place on 2 February 2023, won by the Green Party candidate, which consequently became the largest party on Bristol City Council.

Hotwells and Harbourside is part of the parliamentary constituency of Bristol West. Since 2015 the Member of Parliament is Thangam Debbonaire, a Labour Party member.

2023 by-election

Independent candidate Martin Booth announced on 16 January that he would not campaign, effectively withdrawing, due to a perceived conflict of interest with his role as Bristol24-7 editor. However he remained on the ballot paper. The Conservative Eliana Barbosa was a "paper candidate", who did not attend the hustings or count.

2021 election

2016 election

References 

Wards of Bristol